Wushu at the 2017 Islamic Solidarity Games was held in Baku Sports Hall, Baku, Azerbaijan from 20 May to 22 May 2017. The competition included only men's sanda events.

Medalists

Medal table

References

External links
Official website

2017 Islamic Solidarity Games
2017
2017 in wushu (sport)